Gaali is a Bollywood film. It was released in 1944. A social film, its theme dealt with injustice to women. The music was by Sajjad Hussain with lyrics by Pandit Indra. It starred Karan Dewan, Nirmala, Manjula, and Yakub.

Cast
The cast of the film:
 Karan Dewan
 Nirmala
 Yakub
 Kanhaiyalal
 Sunalini Devi
 Jilloo

References

External links
 

1944 films
1940s Hindi-language films
Indian black-and-white films